Patricia Alonso Jiménez (born 27 April 1979) is a Spanish team handball player who played for the club CB Amadeo Tortajada and on the Spanish national team. She was born in Madrid. She competed at the 2004 Summer Olympics in Athens, where the Spanish team reached the quarter finals.

References

External links

1979 births
Living people
Sportspeople from Madrid
Spanish female handball players
Olympic handball players of Spain
Handball players at the 2004 Summer Olympics
Mediterranean Games gold medalists for Spain
Mediterranean Games medalists in handball
Competitors at the 2005 Mediterranean Games
Handball players from the Community of Madrid